Kana is a French publisher affiliated with Les Éditions Dargaud. Kana was founded in 1996 by Yves Schlirf. The company publishes manga in French and used to publish in Dutch. Its headquarters are in the Dargaud offices in the 18th arrondissement of Paris.

Titles

A Chinese Life (Une vie chinoise)
 Absolute Boyfriend
 Angel Nest
 Bakuman
 Black Butler
 Case Closed
 Dead Dead Demon's Dededede Destruction
 Doraemon
 GE – Good Ending
 Goodnight Punpun
 Harlock Saga
 Honey and Clover
 Hunter × Hunter
 I Am a Hero
In Clothes Called Fat
 Me and the Devil Blues
 Monster
 Mushishi
No. 5
 Piece – Kanojo no Kioku
 Pluto
 Psychometrer Eiji
 The Rose of Versailles
 Saint Seiya: Time Odyssey
 Saturn Apartments
 Sgt. Frog
 Shaman King
 Si loin et si proche
 Snow White with the Red Hair
 Solanin
 The Summit of the Gods
 Tegami Bachi
 What a Wonderful World!
 Undercurrent
 Zipang
 Zatch Bell!

References

External links

Kana website

Comic book publishing companies of France
Publishing companies established in 1996
1996 establishments in France
Mass media in Paris